Lewis Tillman (August 18, 1816 – May 3, 1886) was an American politician and a member of the United States House of Representatives for the 4th congressional district of Tennessee.

Biography
Tillman was born near Shelbyville, Tennessee in Bedford County. He attended the common schools and pursued an academic course.

Career
Tillman served in the Seminole War as a private and engaged in agricultural pursuits. He was a circuit court clerk of Bedford County from 1852 to 1860. He was a colonel of the state militia before the Civil War and the editor of a newspaper in Shelbyville. From 1865 to 1869, he was a clerk and master of the chancery court.

Elected as a member of the Republican Party to the Forty-first Congress, Tillman served from March 4, 1869, to March 3, 1871,  but was not a candidate for renomination in 1870. He returned to agricultural pursuits.

Death
Tillman died in Shelbyville on May 3, 1886. He was interred in Willow Mount Cemetery. His uncle, Barclay Martin, also served as a U.S. congressman. His son James Davidson Tillman was a Confederate colonel and postwar served in the Tennessee Senate and was appointed U.S. Minister to Ecuador by President Grover Cleveland. His son Brigadier General Samuel Escue Tillman was a West Point graduate who served as the Academy's Superintendent during World War I.

References

External links 

 

1816 births
1886 deaths
Southern Unionists in the American Civil War
Clerks
Republican Party members of the United States House of Representatives from Tennessee
19th-century American politicians
People from Shelbyville, Tennessee
United States Army personnel of the Seminole Wars
19th-century American newspaper editors
Farmers from Tennessee